Alf Kvasbø (7 November 1928 – 7 January 2014) was a Norwegian teacher and children's book author.

Biography
Kvasbø was born in Vadsø.  He was a resident in Kongsvinger. A special educator by profession, he made his literary debut in 1962 with Vi ror i natt and followed up with Måsen (1963),"Jubel" I storm (1963) and Nærkamp (1974). He later wrote numerous books that stand out in the children's and young adult genres, namely Springflo (1978), Verk (1979), Besøkstid (1981), Døgn (1983), Venner (1998) and Bitter hamn (1999).

References

1928 births
2014 deaths
People from Vadsø
People from Kongsvinger
Norwegian male novelists
Norwegian children's writers
20th-century Norwegian novelists
20th-century Norwegian male writers